What Am I Crying For is the fifth and final album by Dennis Yost and The Classics IV and their only album on MGM South, released in 1973. It is released in Brazil as Love Me Or Leave Me Alone the following year.

The album failed to chart. The title track was the band's final Top 40 hit on the Billboard Hot 100, peaking at No. 39.

Reception
Despite failing to chart, the album was met with positive reviews. Billboard states that the album has a considerable middle of the road appeal. Gary Graff describes its title track as a fine example of the group's distinctive sound. Bad Cat states, despite Yost's pleasant voice with a middle of the road approach, his performances were deeper and rougher compared to his previous albums.

Track listing

Personnel
Production
Producer: Buddy Buie

Charts
Singles

References

External links

1973 albums
MGM Records albums
Classics IV albums
Albums produced by Buddy Buie